The 2006 Checker Auto Parts 500 Presented by Pennzoil was a NASCAR Nextel Cup Series racing event that took place on November 12, 2006, at Phoenix International Raceway in Avondale, Arizona.

The traditional pre-race ceremonies were held with the showing of the national colors along with the invocation service from a local minister. One of country music's top ten recording artists of 2006, Taylor Swift, sang the national anthem prior to the racing event. The green flag was officially waved at 2:35 p.m. and the checked flag was waved at approximately 5:49 p.m. After this race, Colombian native Juan Pablo Montoya and Australian driver Marcos Ambrose would temporarily become the foreigners that would consistently make the racing grid for all the future NASCAR Cup Series races along with limited degrees of success by Scottish IndyCar driver Dario Franchitti.

Events held alongside the 2006 Checker Auto Parts 500 on the same weekend include the Casino Arizona 150 (NASCAR Craftsman Truck Series) and the Arizona Travel 200 (NASCAR Busch Series).

Entry list

Qualifying 

*Qualified by owner's points.

**Qualified by champion's provisional.

Race recap
For pre-race ceremonies, the Luke Air Force Base Honor Guard presented the nation's colors. Phoenix International Raceway chaplain Ken Bowers gave the invocation. Rising country music artist at the time Taylor Swift performed the national anthem. Doug Bowens, on behalf of Pennzoil would give out the starting command.

Brandon Whitt would "earn" the last-place finish in his only NASCAR Nextel Cup Series start due to a rear end issue on lap 123 of 312.

Kevin Harvick defeated Jimmie Johnson by a ¼ of a second in front of 106,000 people after three hours and fourteen minutes of racing action. Harvick dominated this race, leading exactly 80.7% of the race. There were 12 lead changes in addition to ten caution flag waved by NASCAR for 58 laps. There was at least one red flag in the race; it was waved due to a multi-car accident on lap 305.

This was the final career race for team owner Doug Bawel. It was also the last DNF for Clint Bowyer until the 2009 race in Darlington. Brandon Whitt did a great job making this race, considering the team and his limited experience. His only other start that year was an ARCA race, and he had a DNQ to go with each of them.

The other finishers in the top ten were: Denny Hamlin, Jeff Gordon, Carl Edwards, Mark Martin, Kasey Kahne, Kurt Busch, Dale Earnhardt Jr., and Jeff Burton. Now-retired drivers Kyle Petty and Dale Jarrett also participated in this race during their twilight years. Seven drivers failed to make the race while Robby Gordon was sent to the back of the grid due to an engine replacement. Kyle Busch failed to finish in the top ten in his Hendrick Motorsports #5 Chevrolet Monte Carlo machine.

Drivers were racing for a prize bounty of $4,892,924 ($ when adjusted for inflation) with Jimmie Johnson being ahead of Matt Kenseth by a mere 17 points. While Tony Stewart scored more points than the top ten drivers, the best result that he could come up within the 2006 NASCAR Cup Series season would be eleventh place in the drivers' championship standings. The "Chase for the Cup" formula at that time had the best ten drivers compete for the championship – as opposed to 16 in today's formula.

Results

Timeline
Section reference:
 Start of race: Jeff Gordon started the race as the first-place driver.
 Lap 4: Kevin Harvick took over the lead from Jeff Gordon.
 Lap 71: Caution for debris; ended on lap 76.
 Lap 72: Matt Kenseth took over the lead from Kevin Harvick.
 Lap 73: Kevin Harvick took over the lead from Matt Kenseth.
 Lap 123: Brandon Whitt lost his vehicle's rear end.
 Lap 134: Jimmie Johnson took over the lead from Kevin Harvick.
 Lap 151: Caution for debris; ended on lap 157.
 Lap 152: Sterling Marlin took over the lead from Jimmie Johnson.
 Lap 153: Jimmie Johnson took over the lead from Sterling Marlin.
 Lap 162: Kevin Harvick took over the lead from Jimmie Johnson.
 Lap 188: Caution for oil on track; ended on lap 195.
 Lap 227: Caution for Robby Gordon and Chad Chiffin's joint accident; ended on lap 230.
 Lap 234: Michael Waltrip developed engine problems.
 Lap 253: Caution due to oil on track; ended on lap 257.
 Lap 255: David Gilliland took over the lead from Kevin Harvick.
 Lap 256: Mark Martin took over the lead from David Gilliland.
 Lap 260: Jimmie Johnson took over the lead from Mark Martin.
 Lap 261: Mark Martin took over the lead from Jimmie Johnson.
 Lap 262: Mike Bliss developed engine problems.
 Lap 265: Caution due to Mike Bliss' accident; ended on lap 271.
 Lap 272: Jamie McMurray suffered from his vehicle's terminal crash.
 Lap 274: Caution due to a five-car accident; the caution officially ended on lap 281.
 Lap 283: Kevin Harvick took over the lead from Mark Martin.
 Lap 289: Dale Jarrett suffered from his vehicle's terminal crash.
 Lap 292: Caution due to Sterling Marlin and Dale Jarrett's joint accident; ended on lap 296.
 Lap 298: Jeff Green suffered from his vehicle's terminal crash.
 Lap 300: Caution due to Jeff Green's accident; ended on lap 304.
 Lap 306: Clint Bowyer's vehicle developed a problematic oil line.
 Lap 307: Caution due to Casey Mears spinning off turn two; ended on lap 309.
 Finish: Kevin Harvick won the event.

Standings after the race

External links 
Full qualifying results

References

Checker Auto Parts 500
Checker Auto Parts 500
NASCAR races at Phoenix Raceway
Checker Auto Parts 500